Demonicus of Pella, son of Athenaeus, was presumably one of Alexander's hetairoi and served in 326 BC as a trierarch of the Hydaspes fleet of Nearchus.

References

Generals of Alexander the Great
Ancient Pellaeans
Hetairoi
Trierarchs of Nearchus' fleet